Leptolebias opalescens, also known as the opal pearlfish is a species of killifish in the family Aplocheilidae endemic to Brazil. This species was described as Cynolebias opalescens by George S. Myers in 1942 with the type locality given as the base of the Serra do Petrópolis, near Imbarié in the municipality of Duque de Caxias, Rio de Janeiro.

References

opalescens
Endemic fauna of Brazil
Fauna of Brazil
Taxa named by George S. Myers 
Taxonomy articles created by Polbot
Fish described in 1942
Taxobox binomials not recognized by IUCN